Steve Sharp is a former U.S. soccer forward who played in the Major Indoor Soccer League, Western Soccer Alliance and American Professional Soccer League.  He also earned eight caps, scoring one goal, with the U.S. national team in 1984 and 1985.

Professional
Sharp grew up in California where attended Rolling Hills High School.  In the February 1985, Sharp signed with the New York Cosmos in the Major Indoor Soccer League.  The Cosmos folded a month later.   He appeared briefly for the Tulsa Tornados of the United Soccer League before moving back to California where he spent the summer with the Los Angeles United, an independent outdoor soccer team.  On October 15, 1985, he signed with the Tacoma Stars of the MISL.  He then spent one season with the Los Angeles Heat of the Western Soccer Alliance (WSA) in 1988.  Two years later, he began the season with the Los Angeles Heat, now playing in the American Professional Soccer League.  After seeing little playing time, he requested and gained his release from the team then signed with the San Diego Nomads where he finished the season.

National team
Sharp earned eight caps, scoring one goal, with the U.S. national team in 1984 and 1985.  He earned his first cap as a substitute for Chance Fry in an October 9, 1984 win over El Salvador.  His one goal with the U.S. came in a 2-2 tie with Ecuador on December 2, 1984.  His last appearance with the U.S. came in an April 4, 1985 tie with Canada.

References

American Professional Soccer League players
American soccer players
People from Rancho Palos Verdes, California
Soccer players from California
Los Angeles Heat players
Major Indoor Soccer League (1978–1992) players
New York Cosmos (MISL) players
Nomads Soccer Club players
Tacoma Stars players
United States men's international soccer players
Western Soccer Alliance players
Tulsa Tornados players
United Soccer League (1984–85) players
Living people
Year of birth missing (living people)
Association football forwards